David James Bishop (born 13 September 1948) is a former New Zealand international rugby union referee, who controlled 26 international matches between 1986 and 1995, including at the first three Rugby World Cup tournaments.

Bishop was born in Christchurch on 13 September 1948, the son of James and Myra Bishop, and educated at Geraldine High School. He married Alison Zanders in 1979, and the couple had two children. In 1990, he was awarded the New Zealand 1990 Commemoration Medal.

References

1948 births
Living people
Sportspeople from Christchurch
New Zealand rugby union referees
Rugby World Cup referees